Flow The Max is Flow's eighth studio album. The album comes into two editions: regular and limited. The limited edition includes a bonus DVD. It reached #21 on the Oricon charts  and charted for 4 weeks.

Track listing

Bonus DVD Track listing

References

Flow (band) albums
2013 albums